Tom Kapinos is an American television writer and screenwriter best known for his creation of the Showtime series Californication and the Fox series  Lucifer.

Early life
Kapinos attended Island Trees School District on Long Island, New York.

Career
Kapinos moved from New York to California in the mid-1990s, working in Los Angeles for Creative Artists Agency as a staff story analyst. In 1999, Fox 2000 purchased his first sold screenplay, The Virgin Mary, with actress Jennifer Aniston attached to play the title role. The film was never made, but after reading The Virgin Mary the producers of Dawson's Creek offered Kapinos a job.

After beginning his career in television in 1999 as a writer and eventually executive producer on Dawson's Creek, Kapinos moved on to his own series, Californication, a dramedy on which he was executive producer and chief writer.

Filmography

Television
The numbers in writing credits refer to the number of episodes.

References

External links

Television producers from New York (state)
American television writers
American male screenwriters
Living people
Showrunners
People from Levittown, New York
American male television writers
Screenwriters from New York (state)
Year of birth missing (living people)
20th-century American screenwriters
20th-century American male writers
21st-century American screenwriters
21st-century American male writers